In E. coli and other bacteria, holB is a gene that encodes the delta prime subunit of DNA polymerase III.

References 

Bacterial proteins
DNA replication